Richard J. Balducci (born 1942) is a retired lobbyist and politician from Newington, Connecticut who was the Speaker of the Connecticut House of Representatives from 1989 to 1992. He served one term in the Connecticut State Senate.

Political career 
Balducci currently sits on the board of regents of the Connecticut State Colleges & Universities. He is the head of the Board's Finance and Infrastructure Committee.

Business career 
Balducci taught history for 17 years in the Newington public school system. He was also a partner in New England Recovery, an automobile salvage business.

Balducci is a partner in the lobbying firm Doyle, D'Amore and Balducci.

References 

Living people
Democratic Party members of the Connecticut House of Representatives
Democratic Party Connecticut state senators
1942 births